Princess Caroline Louise of Saxe-Weimar-Eisenach (Karoline Luise; 18 July 1786 – 20 January 1816) was a princess of Mecklenburg-Schwerin by virtue of her marriage. She was the daughter of Charles Augustus, Grand Duke of Saxe-Weimar-Eisenach and his wife Louisa of Hesse-Darmstadt.

Infancy

Caroline was born at the Stadtschloss in Weimar. She was a princess of Saxe-Weimar-Eisenach by birth. The youngest of three children, her older brother Charles Frederick succeeded their father as Grand Duke in 1828. One of Caroline's nieces was Empress Augusta of Germany, wife of William I, German Emperor.

Hereditary Grand Duchess

On 1 July 1810 she became the second wife of Frederick Ludwig, Hereditary Grand Duke of Mecklenburg-Schwerin. The Hereditary Grand Duke had lost his first wife Elena Pavlovna of Russia in September 1804 having died of influenza. Caroline Louise gave her husband three children. Her only daughter married son of Louis Philippe I of the French. She had a loving relationship with her husband.

After the birth of her youngest child, Prince Magnus, her health never recovered and she died aged thirty at the Schloss Ludwigslust. In her deathbed, she suggested her husband should remarry, to her cousin Auguste Fredericka, daughter of Frederick V of Hesse-Homburg; they married in April 1818.

Issue

Albert of Mecklenburg-Schwerin (1812–1834) died unmarried. 
Hélène of Mecklenburg-Schwerin (1814–1858) married Ferdinand Philippe, Duke of Orléans and had issue. 
Magnus of Mecklenburg-Schwerin (1815–1816) died in infancy.

Ancestry

Bibliography
  Hélène de Mecklembourg-Schwerin; Madame la duchesse d'Orléans; Nouvelle édition. Paris: Michel Lévy, 1859. DC 269 .O7 M34 1859

Nobility from Weimar
1786 births
1816 deaths
Duchesses of Mecklenburg-Schwerin
Princesses of Saxe-Weimar-Eisenach
Hereditary Grand Duchesses of Mecklenburg-Schwerin
Deaths in childbirth
Daughters of monarchs